The year 2007 is the 6th year in the history of the Cage Rage Championships, a mixed martial arts promotion based in the United Kingdom. In 2007 Cage Rage Championships held 12 events, Cage Rage 15.

Title fights

Events list

Cage Rage 20

Cage Rage 20 was an event held on February 10, 2007, at Wembley Arena in London, United Kingdom.

Results

Cage Rage Contenders 4

Cage Rage Contenders 4 was an event held on March 4, 2007, at Hammersmith Palais in London, United Kingdom.

Results

Cage Rage 21

Cage Rage 21 was an event held on April 21, 2007, at Wembley Arena in London, United Kingdom.

Results

Cage Rage Contenders: The Real Deal

Cage Rage Contenders: The Real Deal was an event held on May 26, 2007, at The Point in Dublin, Ireland.

Results

Cage Rage Contenders 5

Cage Rage Contenders 5 was an event held on June 16, 2007, at Wembley Arena in London, United Kingdom.

Results

Cage Rage 22

Cage Rage 22 was an event held on July 14, 2007, at Wembley Arena in London, United Kingdom.

Results

Cage Rage Contenders 6

Cage Rage Contenders 6 was an event held on August 18, 2007, in London, United Kingdom.

Results

Cage Rage 23

Cage Rage 23 was an event held on September 22, 2007, at Wembley Arena in London, United Kingdom.

Results

Cage Rage Contenders: Dynamite

Cage Rage Contenders: Dynamite was an event held on September 29, 2007, at National Stadium in Dublin, Ireland.

Results

Cage Rage Contenders 7

Cage Rage Contenders 7 was an event held on November 10, 2007, at The Troxy in London, United Kingdom.

Results

Cage Rage Contenders: Wales

Cage Rage Contenders: Wales was an event held on November 18, 2007, at Brangwyn Hall in Swansea, United Kingdom.

Results

Cage Rage 24

Cage Rage 24 was an event held on December 1, 2007, at Wembley Arena in London, United Kingdom.

Results

See also 
 Cage Rage Championships
 List of Cage Rage champions
 List of Cage Rage events

References

Cage Rage Championships events
2007 in mixed martial arts